Pinky Anand  is an Indian lawyer and was designated as a senior advocate until May 2020. She served as an Additional Solicitor General of India at the Supreme Court of India. She is also a politician.

Education
Anand graduated from Lady Shri Ram College for Women and received her LLB degree from the Faculty of Law, University of Delhi. In 1979–80, she was elected as the first woman Secretary of Delhi University Students Union (DUSU) winning with the highest number of votes. In 1980, she studied at Harvard University to receive a Master of Law degree, supported by an Inlaks Scholarship from the Inlaks Shivdasani Foundation.

Career
Anand is considered an expert in the field of constitutional, property, private international, family, environmental and corporate laws. She was the head of the All-India Legal Cell at the Bharatiya Janata Party (BJP) and is a former Additional Advocate-General for the State of Uttarakhand. In 2007, she was designated as a senior advocate. On 9 July 2014, she was appointed as an Additional Solicitor General of India. She is the second female lawyer to be appointed to this position after Indira Jaising was appointed in the United Progressive Alliance government.  Anand now practices in the Supreme Court of India. Some of the leading cases fought by her are related to constitutional right of freedom and expression for Indian actress Khushbu in which the Supreme Court upheld the rights in a path breaking judgment and quashed 21 cases of defamation. She represented the Government of France in the famous case of the French aircraft carrier Clemenceau against genetically modified food in India, etc. She was the Chairperson, National Committee Law, ASSOCHAM Ladies League. She was the Vice President of Bar Association of India. Anand has received several awards for excellence in law including FICCI and Bharat Nirman, Women Achiever. She was also an Arbitrator with the Indian Council of Arbitrations. According to Anand her life-changing court case was when she, then a novice in law appeared against the reputed jurist L. M. Singhvi and eventually won.

Political career
Anand was a member of All India National Executive of BJP and has served as the national convenor of BJP's legal and legislative cell from 2007 till 2010. She represented BJP in the 5th General Assembly International Conference of Asian Political Parties (ICAPP) at Astana, Kazakhstan-24–26 September 2009 and was elected as the Vice President of the session on Women and Politics. She was a Member of the Delegation of the BJP to Kochi in July 2010.

Other positions
She was the spokesperson for and lead the All India Legal team of Bharatiya Janata Party (BJP). She is Alternate Country Councillor (India) of LAWASIA. She is Chairperson, National Committee Law, ASSOCHAM Ladies League. She has received several awards for excellence in law by FICCI, Lions Club, Amity University & Bharat Nirman, PHD Chamber for Progress Harmony Development. She was a Core Committee member of the National Human Rights Commission. She is a director at the Research Foundation for Science, Technology and Ecology, an NGO in the field of environment. She is a member in the Board of Studies at the School of Law in KIIT University.

She is a speaker and writer active in social issues. She is a well known speaker on media and international and national conferences. Anand lectures in universities in India and abroad and in various international and national conferences such as Women's Forum Global Meeting, Deauville, France in 2008 and Terra Madre, Turin, Italy 2008 and 2010. She is a Fellow of Session 433, "Women, Political Power & Next Generation Leadership" Salzburg Seminar in Austria, 2006.

Currently, she is representing India in the formation of BRICS Legal Forum and serves as a member of the Indian delegation to Brazil. She represented India at II BRICS Legal Forum at Shanghai in October 2015. She was a speaker at the Ladies Study Group, Kolkata at the Seminar on "Law and the Woman" in November 2015. She was also a Panel Speaker at Jaipur Literature Festival 2016.

Awards
 French National Order of Merit from the President of the French Republic
 Award for Excellence in Law 2009, by FICCI FLO for outstanding contribution in the field of law.
 19th Bharat Nirman Awards for Excellence in Law in 2007.

Publications
 Co-author of International Family Law, Jurisdictional Comparisons First Edition 2011, printed by Sweet & Maxwell, UK.

References

External links 

 Pinky Anand at Penguin India

Additional Solicitors General of India
Indian Senior Counsel
Living people
Harvard Law School alumni
Delhi politicians
Bharatiya Janata Party politicians from Delhi
Women in Delhi politics
Year of birth missing (living people)
20th-century Indian lawyers
20th-century Indian women lawyers
21st-century Indian lawyers
21st-century Indian women lawyers